is a passenger railway station located in the city of Ōme, Tokyo, Japan, operated by the East Japan Railway Company (JR East).

Lines
Ōme Station is served by the Ōme Line, located 18.5  kilometers from the terminus of the line at Tachikawa Station.

Station layout
The station has one island platform serving two tracks, with a station building connected to the platform by an underground passage. The station has a Midori no Madoguchi staffed ticket office. The theme song from Himitsu no Akko-chan is used as a departure melody.

Platforms

History
Ōme Station opened on 19 November 1894. It was nationalized in 1944. It became part of the East Japan Railway Company (JR East) with the breakup of the Japanese National Railways in 1987.

Passenger statistics
In fiscal 2019, the station was used by an average of 6,349 passengers daily (boarding passengers only).

Surrounding area
 Ome Railway Park

See also
 List of railway stations in Japan

References

External links

 JR East Station information (JR East) 

Railway stations in Tokyo
Stations of East Japan Railway Company
Railway stations in Japan opened in 1894
Ōme, Tokyo